Deniston may refer to:

People
 Brian Deniston, member of the band Slik
 Charles Rankin Deniston (born 1835), member of the Wisconsin State Assembly
 David Deniston Smith (born 1950), American businessman
 Denis Marshall (footballer) (Deniston Clive Marshall, born 1940), Australian rules footballer
 Matthew Deniston, American political candidate, see 2012 United States House of Representatives elections
 Robert Deniston Hume (1845–1908), cannery owner, pioneer hatchery operator, politician, author, and self-described "pygmy monopolist"
 Shan Deniston (1919–2020), American athlete and sports coach

Other
 Deniston Russell, a character in Laughter in Paradise
 Godfrey, Ontario, a community originally known as Deniston
 Longfellow School (Swissvale, Pennsylvania), also known as Deniston School

See also
Denniston (disambiguation)